Rinalds Sirsniņš (born 4 July 1985 in Ogre, Latvia) is a Latvian professional basketball player. He is currently playing for BK Ogre at the guard position and general manager of the team.

Honours
Latvijas Basketbola līga: 2008
Runner-up: 2003, 2004
FIBA EuroCup: 2008
Polish Basketball League:
Runner-up: 2005

External links
 Profile at basket.ee
 Profile at bbl.net

1985 births
Living people
ASK Riga players
BK Barons players
BC Rakvere Tarvas players
BK Valmiera players
Latvian expatriate basketball people in Estonia
Korvpalli Meistriliiga players
KK Włocławek players
Latvian men's basketball players
MBC Mykolaiv players
Point guards